Dəmirçilər may refer to:

 Dəmirçilər, Khojali, Azerbaijan
 Dəmirçilər, Qazakh (disambiguation), places in Azerbaijan
 Dəmirçilər, Qubadli, Azerbaijan
 Dəmirçilər, Tartar, Azerbaijan

See also
 Demirciler (disambiguation)
 Dəmirçi (disambiguation)
 Demirci (disambiguation)